Otto Huseklepp (2 April 1892 – 31 July 1964) was a Norwegian politician for the Liberal Party.

He was born in Guddalen.

He served as a deputy representative to the Norwegian Parliament from Sogn og Fjordane during the terms 1945–1949 and 1950–1953. He was also a member of Førde municipality council.

See also
Politics of Norway

External links

Helge Barstad at NRK Sogn og Fjordane County Encyclopedia 

1892 births
1964 deaths
Deputy members of the Storting
Liberal Party (Norway) politicians
Sogn og Fjordane politicians